The 2021 Aberto da República was a professional tennis tournament played on outdoor (men) and indoor (women) clay courts. It was the first edition of the tournament which was part of the 2021 ATP Challenger Tour and the 2021 ITF Women's World Tennis Tour. It took place in Brasília, Brazil between 22 and 28 November 2021.

Men's singles main-draw entrants

Seeds

 1 Rankings are as of 15 November 2021.

Other entrants
The following players received wildcards into the singles main draw:
  Mateus Alves
  Gustavo Heide
  Wilson Leite

The following player received entry into the singles main draw as an alternate:
  Alejandro González

The following players received entry from the qualifying draw:
  Bogdan Bobrov
  Luciano Darderi
  Alejandro Gómez
  Tomás Lipovšek Puches

The following player received entry as a lucky loser:
  José Pereira

Women's singles main-draw entrants

Seeds

 1 Rankings are as of 15 November 2021.

Other entrants
The following players received wildcards into the singles main draw:
  Ana Candiotto
  Sofia da Cruz Mendonça
  Júlia Klimovicz
  Maria Luisa Oliveira

The following players received entry using protected rankings:
  Thaísa Grana Pedretti
  Olivia Tjandramulia

The following players received entry from the qualifying draw:
  Martina Capurro Taborda
  Lara Escauriza
  Merel Hoedt
  Jasmin Jebawy
  Katarina Jokić
  Sabastiani León
  Luisa Meyer auf der Heide
  Emily Welker

The following players received entry as lucky losers:
  Maria Lota Kaul
  Noelia Zeballos

Champions

Men's singles

  Federico Coria def.  Jaume Munar 7–5, 6–3.

Women's singles

  Panna Udvardy def.  Elina Avanesyan, 0–6, 6–4, 6–3

Men's doubles

  Mateus Alves /  Gustavo Heide def.  Luciano Darderi /  Genaro Alberto Olivieri 6–3, 6–3.

Women's doubles

  Carolina Alves /  María Lourdes Carlé def.  Valeriya Strakhova /  Olivia Tjandramulia 6–2, 6–1

References

External links
 2021 Aberto da República at ITFtennis.com
 2021 Aberto da República at ATPtour.com

2021 ATP Challenger Tour
2021 ITF Women's World Tennis Tour
2021 in Brazilian sport
November 2021 sports events in South America